American singer Mariah Carey has had an extensive career in film and television throughout her career, in addition to "hundreds of music videos, a dozen or so feature films, and several TV guest-appearances". After topping charts, filming and directing multiple music videos for well-acclaimed songs such as "Vision of Love" and "Fantasy" throughout the 1990s, Carey made her big-screen debut in the rom-com, The Bachelor (1999). In 2001, Carey starred in Glitter which followed the story of Billie Frank, a young woman rising to fame as a pop-star, and was released on September 21, 2001. It was a major commercial failure and critical flop being ranked number 21 on IMDb's Bottom 100 Movies of All Time.

She later starred in films WiseGirls (2002), State Property 2 (2005) and Tennessee (2008) with supporting roles. The latter film received higher praise with Carey's role as Krystal, an aspiring young singer, being called "surprisingly effective". Despite the film's negative reviews, Carey's performance as Raychel in WiseGirls was given favourable reviews in comparison to her role as Billie Frank in Glitter. In 2009, Carey starred in Lee Daniels' film Precious as Ms. Weiss, a social worker, which earned her multiple awards and nominations including a win for the Palm Springs International Film Festival Breakthrough Performance Award. Precious was deemed by some to be Carey's comeback and "return to acting".

In 2013, Carey starred in Daniels' historical drama film, The Butler, which earned her a second nomination for Screen Actors Guild Award for Outstanding Performance by a Cast in a Motion Picture. That same year, Carey signed on as a judge on the twelfth season of American Idol alongside Nicki Minaj, Randy Jackson and Keith Urban but left at the end of the season alongside Minaj. Carey has stated that American Idol was one of the "worst experiences of [her] life. She went on to say that "pitting two females against each other wasn’t cool" and that the show "should have been about the contestants instead of about some nonexistent feud" in relation to her on-set squabbles with Minaj. In 2018, she appeared as a key advisor on The Voice.

In December 2016, Carey starred in her first docu-series, Mariah's World which premiered on the E! cable network. The show followed Carey's Sweet Sweet Fantasy Tour around Europe and her then-plans to get married. The series struggled with ratings, but tended to be well received by some critics including Variety'''s Sonia Saraiya, who praised the show's "surprising sense of humor and humility". The show was cancelled after one season. Carey has also reinvented her image as the "de facto Christmas-time hostess" with multiple Christmas films and specials including a Hallmark Channel special, A Christmas Melody (2015) in which she starred in and directed, along with an Apple TV+ special, Mariah Carey's Magical Christmas Special (2020) in which she starred in and executive produced. In 2015, Carey performed several of her Christmas songs on Mariah Carey's Merriest Christmas, a Hallmark musical event promoting A Christmas Melody.

Carey has also lent her voice to many animated films, most notably The Star (2017) and The Lego Batman Movie (2017). She has also made cameo appearances in numerous films, her first being in Death of a Dynasty (2003) and later on in Girls Trip (2017) among several others. Carey has also recorded theme music for different films and TV shows. One of these songs was in 1998, when Carey and Whitney Houston recorded "When You Believe", from The Prince of Egypt soundtrack. In 2013, Carey performed "Almost Home", the theme song from the film Oz the Great and Powerful. In 2018, Carey stated in an interview that she did not like the song and that "it didn’t feel like [her] at all". In 2019, Carey also wrote and performed the theme song for the TV show, Mixed-ish entitled "In the Mix". Carey stated that "As a biracial woman in the entertainment industry, there was no way [she] did not want to be a part of mixed-ish". Some other songs Carey has performed for movies include "Right to Dream" (from Tennessee), "Infamous" (from Empire) and "The Star" (from the film of the same name). The latter was nominated for the Best Original Song at the 75th Golden Globe Awards.

Having worked with numerous artists throughout her career such as Ol' Dirty Bastard, Justin Bieber, Nicki Minaj, Boyz II Men and Ariana Grande, Carey has accumulated over one billion views on her Vevo account. Her music videos have been given high praise with Vogue'' stating that "since bursting onto the scene in the 1990s, [Carey] has evolved from the American girl next door (jeans and a T-shirt were her staples) to a sultrier, more glamorous aesthetic, complete with a wind machine blowing at all times". Carey has been nominated three times for an MTV Video Music Award for Best Female Video, for her videos "Honey (Bad Boy Remix)", "We Belong Together" and "Touch My Body". In 2021, Carey was honoured at the African American Film Critics Association with a Special Achievement Innovator Award for her "visual storytelling in her music videos and specials".

Music videos

1990s

2000s

2010s

2020s

List of home videos

Filmography

Television

References

Footnotes

Sources

Notes 

 
Carey, Mariah